Crypsimaga is a genus of moths in the family Gelechiidae. It contains the species Crypsimaga cyanosceptra, which is found in New Guinea.

References

Gelechiinae
Taxa named by Edward Meyrick
Moth genera